Georgette Gómez (born November 3, 1975) is an American politician and community activist. She served as a member of the San Diego City Council from 2016 to 2020. Gómez is a Democrat, though city council positions are officially nonpartisan per California state law. In December 2018, Gómez was unanimously appointed president of the city council. Gómez was a candidate for California's 53rd congressional district in the 2020 elections, losing to fellow Democrat Sara Jacobs.

Gómez was a candidate for California's 80th State Assembly district in the 2022 special election following the resignation of Assemblymember Lorena Gonzalez. She was  defeated by San Diego city councilor David Alvarez.

Early life and education

Gómez was born in San Diego to working-class immigrants. She was raised in Barrio Logan. Gómez attended Serra High School and later graduated from San Diego State University, where she studied environmental and natural resource geography.

Career

San Diego City Council 
Gómez was a candidate for the ninth district of the San Diego City Council in the 2016 San Diego City Council election after incumbent Marti Emerald opted not to seek reelection. The ninth district includes the neighborhoods of Alvarado Estates, City Heights, College Area, College View Estates, El Cerrito, Kensington, Mountain View, Mt. Hope, Rolando, Southcrest, and Talmadge. In the June 2016 primary, Gómez came in second to Ricardo Flores, Emerald's chief of staff. Since no candidate received a majority of the votes in the primary, a runoff election was held in November 2016 between Flores and Gómez. Gómez was then elected to the City Council in November with a majority of the votes.

On December 10, 2018, the city council voted unanimously to appoint Gómez to be the council president. In this role, she automatically gained a seat on the board of directors of the San Diego Association of Governments. She also served as the chairwoman of the San Diego Metropolitan Transit System from January 2018 to October 2019. Under Gómez, the city moved to create a community choice energy agency called San Diego Community Power (as an alternative to SDG&E), a strategy which makes up half of the emissions reductions in the San Diego Climate Action Plan.

2020 congressional election 
In September 2019, Gómez announced her candidacy in the 2020 elections to represent California's 53rd congressional district in the United States House of Representatives. Gómez and Sara Jacobs advanced to the November 2020 runoff election. In the runoff, Gomez campaigned as both a progressive and a strong supporter of Israel; she was endorsed by Democratic Majority for Israel, which caused her to lose support from the Justice Democrats. Jacobs beat Gomez 59.5%-40.5% in the November 2020 general election.

In June 2020, Gómez expressed support for a petition calling for a name change of the Andrew Jackson Federal Post Office in her district due to his history of owning slaves and his part in the forced displacement of  Native Americans during the Trail of Tears.

On October 8, 2020, the San Diego Union Tribune reported that Gómez failed to pay taxes on her city council salary in 2017. Gómez admitted the mistake and amended her filing.

2022 California's 80th Assembly district election 
Gómez announced her candidacy to represent California's 80th Assembly District on January 3, 2022; the same day Lorena Gonzalez announced her resignation. In the special election on April 5, 2022, no candidate received a majority of the votes. Gómez and fellow Democrat David Alvarez advanced to a runoff election to be held June 7, 2022. In September 2022, she withdrew from the race.

Election results

Personal life 
Gómez resides in the Azalea Park neighborhood within City Heights.

References

External links

 Council President Georgette Gómez government website
 Georgette Gómez for Congress campaign website
 

|-

1975 births
California Democrats
Hispanic and Latino American politicians
Lesbian politicians
LGBT Hispanic and Latino American people
American LGBT city council members
LGBT people from California
Living people
San Diego City Council members
Women city councillors in California
San Diego State University alumni
Candidates in the 2020 United States elections
21st-century American women politicians
21st-century American politicians